This is a list of stadium in Malaysia.

List of stadiums

Racing venues

References

 
Malaysia
 
Stadium